William Slocum may refer to:
William J. Slocum (1884–1943), also known as Bill, American sports writer
William F. Slocum (1851–1934), American educator, president of Colorado College
Bill Slocum (William L. Slocum, born 1947), American politician

See also
William Slocum Groesbeck (1815–1897), American politician
Slocum (disambiguation)
William Slocumb (1810–1865), physician and political figure in Nova Scotia, Canada